Keji Giwa (born October 28, 1977) is a British-born Nigerian entrepreneur with key interests and expertise in digital technology strategy and execution; he is the founder & CEO of Digital Bananas Technology, a digital solutions provider and Career Insights, and e-work experience platform. Both companies operate and offer services in the UK and sub-Saharan Africa.

Early life and education 
Giwa was born in Hackney, London and spent his early primary and secondary education in Nigeria. He came back to the UK at age 16 to further his education and received a degree in Computer Science from Kingston University, in the United Kingdom. He is a professional member of the British Computer Society.

Career 
Giwa founded the tech incubator Digital Bananas Technology in 2008 and has worked as a consultant in the UK and within sub-Saharan Africa. In 2014 he created the digital product management platform Career Insights, a sister company of DBT.

Early in his career, Giwa worked as quality assurance manager at Digivate, digital media project manager at Moveme, and business development manager at Reevoo.com. Giwa is also responsible for the business and technology strategy for GrantMyWish, a mobile gifting app for friends, and Tellallmyfriends, a business card sharing app for small businesses; he was part of creating the Reeviu app, a social media plug in for online reviews.

His group gifting app, GrantMyWish was shortlisted for the 2012 eConsultancy digital awards for innovation in customer experience.

References

Living people
1977 births
People from Hackney Central
Alumni of Kingston University
21st-century Nigerian businesspeople
English people of Yoruba descent
Nigerian technology businesspeople
Yoruba businesspeople